The Siu Lek Yuen Nullah is one of the nullahs of the Shing Mun River in Siu Lek Yuen, Hong Kong.

See also
List of rivers and nullahs in Hong Kong

External links

Rivers of Hong Kong, in Chinese

Siu Lek Yuen
Rivers of Hong Kong